Vadaine Aston James Oliver (born 21 October 1991) is an English professional footballer who plays as a striker for Bradford City. 

He has played in the English Football League for Crewe Alexandra, Mansfield Town, York City, Notts County, Morecambe, Northampton Town and Gillingham.

Career

Early life and career
Oliver was born in Sheffield, South Yorkshire. He began his career with Sheffield Wednesday's youth system, and signed a professional contract in 2010. He was released by the club in May 2012, before joining Conference Premier club Lincoln City on 4 August 2012 on a one-year contract. He scored 13 goals for Lincoln in the 2012–13 season, 11 of which came in the league.

He attracted interest from Football League clubs and signed for League One club Crewe Alexandra on 10 June 2013 on a two-year contract for an undisclosed fee. He made his debut as an 89th-minute substitute in a 3–3 draw with Rotherham United on 3 August 2013. Oliver scored his first Crewe goal after sliding in from a Brad Inman cross in the 15th minute of a 2–2 draw at home to Peterborough United on 7 September 2013.

York City

Oliver signed for League Two club York City on 20 May 2015 on a three-year contract. He made his debut when starting York's 3–0 away defeat by Wycombe Wanderers on 8 August 2015, the opening match of 2015–16. His first goal for the club came in the 59th minute of a 3–0 away win over Newport County on 5 September 2015, with a close-range shot after James Berrett's shot was saved. Early in the season, Oliver showed a desire to flick on aerial balls, but once that desire seemingly disappeared he "cut a lethargic figure up front", according to Dave Flett of The Press. He finished the season as York's top scorer with 10 goals from 42 appearances, although he only scored once in his last 19 appearances. Following York's relegation to the National League after finishing 24th in League Two, Oliver was transfer listed by the club.

On 2 August 2016, Oliver joined League Two club Notts County on loan until 7 January 2017. He debuted four days later as a 56th-minute substitute for Jon Stead in a 2–0 defeat away to Yeovil Town. He scored his first goal for the club in a 2–1 loss against Morecambe on 11 October 2016.

On 21 May 2017, Oliver started as York beat Macclesfield Town 3–2 at Wembley Stadium in the 2017 FA Trophy Final, scoring in the 22nd minute with a three-yard shot from Sean Newton's low cross. He finished 2016–17 with 10 goals from 23 appearances for York as the club was relegated to the National League North after finishing in 21st place in the National League. He was transfer listed at the end of the season at his own request.

Morecambe and Northampton Town
Oliver signed for League Two club Morecambe on 30 June 2017 for an undisclosed fee, on a contract of undisclosed length. He scored his first goal for Morecambe in a 4–3 EFL Cup defeat away to Barnsley on 8 August 2017. He was released by Morecambe at the end of the 2018–19 season.

Oliver signed for League Two club Northampton Town on 3 July 2019 on a one-year contract.

Gillingham
Oliver signed for League One club Gillingham on 5 August 2020. He scored his first goal for Gillingham in a 2–1 home win over Crawley Town on 8 September in the EFL Trophy with a 52nd-minute header. After scoring eight goals in eight games, on 9 April 2021, Oliver was awarded the League One Player of the Month award for March 2021. He finished the 2020–21 season as the Kent side's top goal scorer, with 20 goals in all competitions.

Oliver was also top scorer the following season with 11 goals in all competitions, but could not prevent Gillingham's relegation to League Two. Oliver announced on his Twitter account that he would be leaving the Kent side at the end of his contract.

Bradford City
On 10 July 2022, Oliver signed for League Two club Bradford City on a three-year deal.

Career statistics

Honours

Club
York City
FA Trophy: 2016–17

Northampton Town
EFL League Two play-offs: 2020

Individual
League One Player of the Month: March 2021
Gillingham Players' Player of the Season: 2020–21

References

External links

Profile at the Gillingham F.C. website

1991 births
Living people
Footballers from Sheffield
English footballers
Association football forwards
Sheffield Wednesday F.C. players
Lincoln City F.C. players
Crewe Alexandra F.C. players
Mansfield Town F.C. players
York City F.C. players
Notts County F.C. players
Morecambe F.C. players
Northampton Town F.C. players
Gillingham F.C. players
National League (English football) players
English Football League players
Black British sportspeople
Bradford City A.F.C. players